Two Fat Ladies was a British cooking programme starring Jennifer Paterson and Clarissa Dickson Wright.  It originally ran for four series - twenty-four episodes, from 9 October 1996 to 28 September 1999, being produced by Optomen Television for the BBC.  Since then, the show has been repeated frequently on the Food Network and Cooking Channel in the US and on the Australian Broadcasting Corporation. In the UK, the show has been transmitted many times on the satellite channel Good Food.

Programme

The show centred on Jennifer Paterson and Clarissa Dickson Wright travelling the United Kingdom for most of the episodes, except for one episode in Ireland and a Christmas special in Jamaica, on a Triumph Thunderbird motorcycle driven by Paterson. It sported the registration N88 TFL (the British bingo call for number 88 is "Two Fat Ladies", initialised in the suffix "TFL" of the registration) and had a Watsonian Jubilee GP-700 "doublewide" sidecar where Dickson Wright rode. They travelled to various destinations, such as an army garrison and an all-girls school, where they prepared large meals, often with unusual ingredients.

Paterson's uncle, Anthony Bartlett, was Gentiluomo to the Cardinal Archbishop of Westminster, and so one episode was videotaped at Westminster Cathedral and another at an Irish convent. While cooking at Westminster Cathedral, Paterson cooked an original dish, Peaches Cardinal Hume. In the same episode, Dickson Wright demonstrated a bubble and squeak recipe which used two ounces of lard, which she insisted is the only fat besides beef dripping that could ever get hot enough to produce the recipe as it should be produced. Similarly, her recipe for buttered spatchcock saw chickens covered with a thick layer of butter, bread and more butter on top of the bread. Recipes such as this led to criticism by some who considered them to be a bad influence on the British diet.

Optomen Television had this to say, as if in reply to their critics: "The Ladies are cooks not chefs – they reject the pretensions and elaborations of haute cuisine and are aggressively unfashionable, delighting in such ingredients as clotted cream, lard and fatty meats."

Theme song 

Paterson and Dickson Wright sang their own theme song written by composer Pete Baikie, and Paterson often burst into song during the show, once introducing apple pan dowdy with a verse from the song "Shoo-Fly Pie and Apple Pan Dowdy" (erroneously attributing the song to The Andrews Sisters). They revelled in cooking at grand locations, such as at Lennoxlove House near Edinburgh.

Deaths
Paterson died of lung cancer on 10 August 1999, aged 71, one month after diagnosis. The day before she died, she asked Dickson Wright to bring her a tin of caviar but when Dickson Wright arrived at the hospital, Paterson had already died. Dickson Wright said that after Paterson's funeral, she ate the caviar as a tribute to her friend. Dickson Wright died in the Edinburgh Royal Infirmary on 15 March 2014 from pneumonia induced by an undisclosed illness. She was 66.

Cookbooks
"The Two Fat Ladies" produced four cookbooks which accompanied each of the four television series. In order: Two Fat Ladies: Gastronomic Adventures (with Motorbike and Sidecar), The Two Fat Ladies Ride Again, The Two Fat Ladies: Full Throttle and Two Fat Ladies Obsessions.

DVD release
The Two Fat Ladies DVD set was released in the United States in July 2008. The Acorn Media UK set includes a 40-minute BBC tribute to Paterson, biographies of the stars and "six yummo recipes" in a booklet. It contains all 24 episodes across four discs. The show had previously been released in Britain as a Region 2 DVD set.

Series overview

Series 1: 9 October 1996 to 13 November 1996 (6 episodes)
Series 2: 29 September 1997 to 24 December 1997 (7 episodes)
Series 3: 2 September 1998 to 22 December 1998 (7 episodes)
Series 4: 7 September 1999 to 28 September 1999 (4 episodes)

Episode list

Series 1 (1996)

Series 2 (1997)

Series 3 (1998)

Series 4 (1999)

Note: Production of Series 4 was cut short by the death of Jennifer Paterson shortly after completion of the fourth and final episode of Series 4.

References

External links
 
 Two Fat Ladies at Cooking Channel

1996 British television series debuts
1999 British television series endings
1990s British cooking television series
Food Network original programming
BBC Television shows
Entertainer duos
British cooking television shows
Motorcycle television series
Television series by All3Media
Australian Broadcasting Corporation original programming